Gol Zadini-ye Zirkal (also Romanized as Gol Zadanī-ye Zīrkal; also known as Gol Zadanī) is a village in Tayebi-ye Sarhadi-ye Sharqi Rural District, Charusa District, Kohgiluyeh County, Kohgiluyeh and Boyer-Ahmad Province, Iran. At the 2006 census, its population was 21, in 6 families.

References 

Populated places in Kohgiluyeh County